Suradit Yongcharoenchai (born 28 October 1998) is a Thai professional golfer who plays on the European Tour and Asian Tour. Yongcharoenchai turned professional in 2015 when he was 17. He got his first win on the Asian Tour at the Mercuries Taiwan Masters in October 2019.

Amateur wins
2013 TGA-CAT Junior Ranking 6, TGA-Singha Junior Ranking 2, Zhang Lian Wei Cup, Sports Hero, TGA-Singha Junior Ranking 3, Thailand Amateur Open, TGA-Singha Junior Championship, Singha Thailand Junior World Championships, Asia Pacific Junior Championship
2014 Lion City Cup

Source:

Professional wins (2)

Asian Tour wins (1)

All Thailand Golf Tour wins (1)

Source:

Team appearances
Amateur
Eisenhower Trophy (representing Thailand): 2014

References

External links

Suradit Yongcharoenchai
Asian Tour golfers
1998 births
Living people